Samuel Serle (1620–1683) was an English politician who sat in the House of Commons  between 1656 and 1660.

Serle was the son of Hugh Serle, yeoman of Hale, and was baptised in July 1620. He was apprenticed to a merchant taylor in London in 1638. He was a captain of the militia for  Devon in 1650.  In 1656, he was elected Member of Parliament for Honiton in the Second Protectorate Parliament.  He was a commissioner for assessment in 1657.  In 1659, he was re-elected MP for Honiton  for the Third Protectorate Parliament. He was commissioner for  militia in March 1660 and became a major in April 1660. Also in 1660 he was re-elected MP for Honiton for the Convention Parliament.

In 1679 Serle stood unsuccessfully for parliament again and became commissioner for assessment.
 
Serle died at the age of 63 and was buried at Honiton on 2 February 1683.

Serle married Mary and had ten sons and two daughters.

References

1620 births
1683 deaths
Members of the Parliament of England (pre-1707) for Honiton
English MPs 1656–1658
English MPs 1659
English MPs 1660